Hugo Cuypers (born 7 February 1997) is a Belgian professional footballer who plays as a forward for Belgian club Gent.

Club career

Youth
Cuypers began his career at Zwaluw Vechmaal, followed by fourth-tier Belgian side Excelsior Veldwezelt. When the latter went bankrupt in 2012, Cuypers moved to Visé. He played for Les Oies for three seasons, and was eventually picked up by Belgian top tier side Standard Liège in the summer of 2014, when Visé also went bankrupt.

Standard Liège
After his move to Les Rouches, Cuypers' made an impression in his debut season for the club's U−19 outfit, scoring 31 times and dishing out 13 assists. He added an additional 2 goals with Standard Liège U−21, thus drawing the interest of several European top clubs. In June 2015, Cuypers signed a new two-year contract with Standard Liège and made his professional debut on 3 April 2016, coming in as a late substitute for Renaud Emond during the play-off II home match vs. Waasland-Beveren.

RFC Seraing (loan)
On 31 October 2016, Cuypers was loaned out to Belgian First Amateur Division side Seraing. He managed to score six goals in a total of nineteen caps during his loan spell.

Ergotelis
In the summer of 2017, Cuypers was acquired by Greek Football League side Ergotelis, owned by Egyptian businessman Maged Samy, who also owned Belgian second tier side Lierse at the time. Despite rumors of a possible loan move to Lierse, Cuypers signed a two-year contract with the Cretans and joined Ergotelis' pre-season build-up at Karpenisi.

During his first season with the Cretans, Cuypers became a permanent starter and made an immediate impact for his new club, scoring three goals in the first four matches of the 2017–18 Greek Football League during a 1−1 draw vs. Chania − Kissamikos on 5 November 2017, a 2−1 loss vs. Panachaiki on 12 November 2017, and a 2−3 loss vs. Aris on 19 November 2017. Despite Ergotelis' rough start and early struggle to avoid relegation, Cuypers became the club's most prolific player, strongly following up on his early performances by scoring goals on a regular basis and eventually "victimizing" 14 out of the total 16 opponents faced by Ergotelis during the season. He had his first two-goal performance vs. Veria on 21 January 2018, a feat he repeated on 1 April against fellow relegation candidates Panegialios during a decisive 5−1 home win for the Cretans. At the end of the first round, Cuypers had already scored 11 goals in 16 games and by match-day 27 he had tallied up 20 goals, almost single-handedly giving his club a chance of staying in the division. He became the first player to score over 20 goals for Ergotelis in one season in 12 years, a feat which earned Cuypers a spot in the club's list of all-time top-scorers in Greek professional division. On 20 May 2018 Cuypers scored his fourth brace during the season, in a 5−1 home win against Aiginiakos, which cemented his team's place above the relegation zone. After scoring 22 goals in 28 caps, Cuypers became the most productive player in club history in the competition, surpassing Ergotelis' all-time scoring legend Patrick Ogunsoto's 21-goal season performance in 2006. His performances reportedly drew the attention of several Greek top-tier clubs as a result, including newly-crowned Superleague champions AEK Athens, who reportedly placed a €380,000 bid for the player, along with offering two of the club's players on loan to the Cretans. However, despite reports of the two teams reaching a deal, the transfer fell through after both Cuypers and manager Jacques Lichtenstein gave statements to the Belgian press, which ruled out any transfer to AEK Athens, reportedly due to «lack of respect». He subsequently failed to report for Ergotelis' 2018−19 pre-season preparation and effectively placed himself out of the team.

Olympiacos
On 18 June 2019, Cuypers joined Olympiacos signing a three years' contract for an undisclosed fee. During the 2018–19 season, the Belgian forward didn’t play in a single match for Ergotelis, as the Cretan club finished in fourth place of the Football League to miss out on promotion.

On 17 August 2019, Cuypers joined Ajaccio on a season-long loan from Olympiacos.

Mechelen
On 4 June 2021, Mechelen has announced Cuypers and according to the publications, Olympiacos will receive €1 million for the transfer, and will keep a 50% in a possible resale.
On 14 June 2021, his transfer to Mechelen, in which he signed a four-year contract, was officially concluded, following an official announcement from Olympiacos.

Gent
On 14 June 2022, Cuypers signed a four-year contract with Gent.

International career
Cuypers has represented Belgium with the U−19 national team during the 2016 UEFA European Under-19 Championship qualification. He played in all three matches during the Elite round of the competition, scoring one goal vs. Bulgaria in his only match as a starter.

Career statistics

Honours
Standard Liège
Belgian Cup: 2015–16

Olympiacos
Super League Greece: 2020–21

Individual
Football League Best Foreign Player Award: 2017−18

References

External links
 

1997 births
Living people
Footballers from Liège
Belgian footballers
Belgium youth international footballers
Belgian expatriate footballers
Belgian Pro League players
Super League Greece players
Football League (Greece) players
Ligue 2 players
Standard Liège players
Ergotelis F.C. players
Olympiacos F.C. players
R.F.C. Seraing (1922) players
AC Ajaccio players
K.V. Mechelen players
K.A.A. Gent players
Expatriate footballers in Greece
Expatriate footballers in France
Belgian expatriate sportspeople in Greece
Belgian expatriate sportspeople in France
Association football forwards